Tim McCanlies (born 1953) is a film director and screenwriter. He is best known for writing and directing Secondhand Lions, and for writing the screenplay for The Iron Giant.

Biography 
Tim McCanlies is a fifth-generation
Texan, but rarely called one place home for long.  McCanlies’ father was in the Air Force and
the family traveled extensively. In his early years he was interested in both
acting and the technical processes that took place behind the scenes, along
with the process of filming scenes.  By second grade
he was writing his own novels. While he was in high school he did not
participate in the school's theatre program, but instead went to the local
movie theatre and learned how to run the projector.

McCanlies attended high school in Bryan, Texas and took some college-level courses at nearby Texas A&M University. In 1971, he moved to Austin and enrolled at the University of Texas majoring in Radio-Television-Film. After a couple of years, McCanlies transferred back to Texas A & M. In 1975, he moved to Dallas where he worked as a police officer and took graduate film classes at Southern Methodist University.

Career 
Once McCanlies started taking graduate classes at Southern Methodist, he learned proper screenplay techniques
and made several short films that were well accepted in national film
competitions. After the making of these films he was offered the opportunity to
direct commercials near the Dallas area, but he decided against this and moved
to Los Angeles to attempt movie screenplays in 1978. After moving to Los Angeles he
planned on attending the American Film Institute. While he was in L.A. he found
his first paying job for writing was a low budget film called Crazies. While these low budget
screenplays did give him experience in the business, it did not pay a great
deal, so he needed another income. He supported himself during this time by writing
computer programs. With money being low during this time, McCanlies decided against
enrolling in the Film Institute as he had planned.

McCanlies worked for Walt Disney Studios in the 1980s (The Fox and the Hound) as a story artist and wrote for all the major motion picture studios at one time or another. After signing a two-year contract
with Disney Studios as his first job in the Hollywood system, he pitched his
own screenplay to the studio, but was turned down. After McCanlies' contract with Disney was finished, and after marrying his wife Suzanne
in 1988, they moved back to Texas.  At this time he started to work
with most of the major studios as a script doctor and writer for hire.  He worked on films such as Touchstone's Shoot to Kill (1988), Warner Bros’ Little Giants (1994) and My Fellow Americans (1996). Around this
time he was also invited to speak at the first Heart of Austin Heart of Texas
Film Festival and Screenwriters conference in 1994. More recently he adapted a novel written by Turk Pipkin into a film called When Angels Sing.

Selected filmography

Dancer, Texas Pop. 81 

He started production on his directional debut, Dancer, Texas Pop. 81, in 1997, thanks to the support from Ignite
Entertainment.  The film grossed just
under $700,000 in the United States. It was met with mixed reviews, with the
film staying in theatres longer in McCanlies’ home state of Texas, while being
removed from New York theatres after only a week. The film began to be played
in other rural areas after its initial release. The film then made its way to
the London Film Festival, as well as playing in Australia.

The Iron Giant 

He wrote the screenplay for The Iron Giant
in 1999. The film received universal acclaim and it ranked seventh in Premiere's list
of the 100 best movies of 1999, which was a summary of the critics’ picks for
the year. He won multiple awards for his work, including an Annie Award
(accomplishments in animation) and an award from the British Academy of Film
and Television Arts.

Secondhand Lions 
His second directing project, Secondhand Lions had more success than his first. This film had much more of a draw due to bigger-name actors.  It starred Robert Duvall, Michael Caine, and Haley Joel Osment in a story about a young boy staying with his strange uncles for the summer.  It was released in 2003 and was met with mostly good reviews, including Roger Ebert giving it three out of four stars.

Filmography

References

External links

1953 births
Annie Award winners
Film directors from Texas
Screenwriters from Texas
Living people
Southern Methodist University alumni
Texas A&M University alumni
Moody College of Communication alumni